Peter Handschmann (born 23 May 1957) is an Austrian former ice dancer. With his sister, Susi Handschmann, he is a six-time Austrian national champion (1975–1980) and competed at two Winter Olympics (1976, 1980).

Personal life 
Peter Handschmann was born on 23 May 1957 in Vienna, Austria. He is the elder brother of Susi Handschmann.

Career 
The Handschmann siblings won their first national title in 1975. They finished 16th at the 1975 European Championships in Copenhagen, Denmark.

The following season, the Handschmanns placed 11th at the 1976 European Championships in Geneva, Switzerland. In February, they competed at their first Olympics, held in Innsbruck, Austria; they withdrew following the compulsory dances, in which they ranked 12th. Returning to competition, they finished 12th at the 1976 World Championships in Gothenburg, Sweden.

The Handschmanns created the Austrian Waltz pattern dance. They first performed it in 1979 in Vienna. Their best ISU Championship results, 7th, came at the 1979 Europeans in Zagreb, Yugoslavia, and 1979 Worlds in Vienna.

In their final competitive season, the siblings won their sixth consecutive national title and placed 11th at the 1980 Winter Olympics in Lake Placid, New York.

Results 
(with Susi Handschmann)

References

Navigation

Austrian male ice dancers
Olympic figure skaters of Austria
Figure skaters at the 1976 Winter Olympics
Figure skaters at the 1980 Winter Olympics
1957 births
Living people